Gerard Casey (born 1951) is an Irish academic who is Professor Emeritus at University College Dublin.

Career
He holds law degrees from the University of London (LLB) and UCD (LLM) as well as a primary degree in philosophy from University College Cork, an MA and PhD from the University of Notre Dame and the higher doctorate, DLitt, from the National University of Ireland. He was formerly Assistant Professor at The Catholic University of America (Washington, D.C.) 1983–1986. He was a member of the School of Philosophy in University College Dublin (UCD) (Head from 2001–2006) from 1986 until he retired in December 2015. He is a Fellow of Mises UK, an Associated Scholar of the Ludwig von Mises Institute in Auburn, Alabama, and an Associate Editor of the Christian Libertarian Review. He is also a member of the Free Speech Union. He has been a member of the Royal Institute of Philosophy, the American Philosophical Association and The Aristotelian Society. In December 2006, Casey, along with host Pat Kenny and Richard Dawkins, appeared on The Late Late Show to discuss Dawkins’s book The God Delusion.

Activism and authorship

He was active in Irish politics in the 1990s and led the Christian Solidarity Party between 1993 and 1999. He now holds libertarian and what he terms (philosophically) anarchistic views. His philosophical interests include political philosophy, philosophy of law and philosophy of religion. He has appeared from time to time on radio and TV in Ireland and the UK, contributing to discussions on topical social and political issues. More recently, some recordings of him speaking on different topics can be found online. He describes himself as Catholic in religion, in social matters, conservative, and in political matters, libertarian. His book Murray Rothbard  (Vol. 15 in the series Major Conservative and Libertarian Thinkers) was published by Continuum in 2010 and became available in paperback in August 2013. Libertarian Anarchy: Against the State, was published by Continuum in July 2012 (UK) [September 2012 USA]. A comprehensive history of Western political thought from the perspective of liberty, Freedom's Progress?, was published by Imprint Academic in September 2017. ZAP: Free Speech and Tolerance in the light of the Zero Aggression Principle, was published by Societas in October 2019. After #MeToo: Feminism, Patriarchy, Toxic Masculinity and Sundry Cultural Delights, also published by Societas, appeared in March 2020. Hidden Agender: Transgenderism's Struggle against Reality, was published (again by Societas) in March 2021. In an article, "Can You Own Yourself?" (2011), Casey argue that voluntary slavery contracts are logically possible if the concept of self-owned property is actively interpreted.

Books 
 Born Alive: The Legal Status of the Unborn Child (Barry Rose, 2005) 
 Murray Rothbard (Continuum, 2010) Vol. 15 in the series Major Conservative and Libertarian Thinkers 
 Libertarian Anarchy: Against the State (Continuum, 2012) 
 Freedom's Progress?: A History of Political Thought (Imprint Academic, 2017) 
 ZAP: Free Speech and Tolerance in the light of the Zero Aggression Principle  (Societas, 2019)
 After #MeToo: Feminism, Patriarchy, Toxic Masculinity and Sundry Cultural Delights (Societas, 2020)
 Hidden Agender: Transgenderism's Struggle against Reality (Societas, 2021)

Notes 

1951 births
Austrian School economists
Irish philosophers
Irish libertarians
Mises Institute people
Living people
Notre Dame College of Arts and Letters alumni
20th-century Irish philosophers
21st-century Irish philosophers
Critics of atheism